Limonene 1,2-monooxygenase is an enzyme with systematic name limonene,NAD(P)H:oxygen oxidoreductase. This enzyme catalyses the following chemical reaction

 (1) (S)-limonene + NAD(P)H + H+ + O2  1,2-epoxymenth-8-ene + NAD(P)+ + H2O
 (2) (R)-limonene + NAD(P)H + H+ + O2  1,2-epoxymenth-8-ene + NAD(P)+ + H2O

Limonene 1,2-monooxygenase flavoprotein (FAD).

References

External links 
 

EC 1.14.13